Terran R is a medium-lift two-stage, fully reusable launch vehicle under development by Relativity Space. The vehicle is primarily constructed with 3D printing technologies, much like its predecessor, the small-lift Terran 1.

Description
The first stage will use seven Aeon R engines, producing an estimated thrust of 1.33  MN (300,000 lbs) each. The second stage will use an upgraded Aeon 1 engine with a copper chamber. Relativity Space CEO Tim Ellis has compared the design of Terran R to SpaceX's Starship vehicle. In July 2022, Relativity announced it partnered with Impulse Space to send a payload to Mars in 2025.

References 

Space launch vehicles of the United States